The 2014–15 Cayman Islands Premier League season is the 36th season of top-tier football in the Cayman Islands. It began on 13 September 2014 and ends on 3 May 2015. Bodden Town FC are the reigning champions, coming off their second consecutive league title.

Teams
Academy SC and North Side SC were each relegated to the Cayman Islands First Division after finishing in seventh and eighth place, respectively, in last season's competition. Roma United and Cayman Brac FC were each promoted from the First Division.

Standings

Promotion/relegation playoff

The 7th place team in this competition will face the runners-up of the First Division for a place in next season's competition.

Results

Regular home games

References

External links
Soccerway

Cayman Islands Premier League seasons
1
Cayman